Zoë Elizabeth Sugg (born 28 March 1990), also known by her online name Zoella, is an English media personality, entrepreneur, and author. She began her career as a YouTuber in 2009, and has since amassed over 10 million subscribers.

In 2014, Sugg launched her Zoella Beauty range of cosmetics and later launched a range of complementary homeware products, with a 2019 report stating that the two businesses had a combined revenue of £3.8 million per year. Her debut novel, Girl Online, was published in November 2014 and broke the record for highest first-week sales of a first-time novelist. She has since released two sequels and a non-fiction book, Cordially Invited, and is currently writing a series of books alongside co-author Amy McCulloch titled The Magpie Society.

Early life
Zoë Elizabeth Sugg was born in Lacock, Wiltshire, on 28 March 1990. She has a younger brother, Joe Sugg, who is also a YouTuber. She attended The Corsham School in nearby Corsham. She earned A-levels in art, photography, and textiles, but did not attend university due to her anxiety disorder and not knowing what she wanted to do later in life.

Career

2009–2013: Career beginnings
Sugg was working as an apprentice at an interior design company when she created her blog, "Zoella", in February 2009. By the end of the year it had a thousand followers and  it had received over 540 million total visits. The fashion, beauty and lifestyle blog expanded into a YouTube channel in 2009, while Sugg was working for British clothing retailer New Look. Sugg's main channel, Zoella, first named "zoella280390" after her birth date, is mostly fashion, beauty hauls, and "favourites" videos (showing her favourite products of the previous month). Her second channel, MoreZoella, contains mostly vlogs where she shows her viewers what she does in her day. She is a member of the Style Haul network and is represented by Dominic Smales at Gleam Futures. In 2013, Sugg was mentioned by The Telegraph as one of "Britain's most influential Tweeters". In 2013, she was named as one of the National Citizen Service's ambassadors, helping to promote the newly launched youth service. The following year, she was named as the first "digital ambassador" for Mind, the mental health charity.

2014–2019: Zoella brands, book releases and media appearances

Sugg launched a range of beauty products under the brand name Zoella Beauty in September 2014. The "bath and beauty" range launch was, according to the Metro, the "biggest beauty launch of the year". The products were developed and manufactured by Gloucestershire-based family-owned company SLG Allstars Ltd. She launched an edition of the products called "Tutti Fruity" in 2015, as well as a limited Christmas edition. Sugg has been a director of ZS Beauty Ltd, a wholesaler of perfume and cosmetics, since 2016. In 2016, Sugg launched an edition called "Sweet Inspirations", followed by other ranges including "Jelly & Gelato", "Splash Botanics" and "Fruit Medley".

In September 2016, Sugg released a collection of homeware products, including stationery, candles and reed diffusers. This range was exclusive to Boots. Each year subsequently, Sugg released a new collection of limited edition items under the Zoella Lifestyle brand, distributed by many UK retailers including Boots, Superdrug, WHSmith, Dunelm, House of Fraser and FeelUnique. Sugg has been a director of ZS Lifestyle Ltd since 2016. In March 2019, Sugg stated in her vlog that she had decided not to renew her licensing agreement with SLG, adding that it was "by far the project that earns me the most money out of anything I do". Sugg explained that she and SLG didn't agree on certain decisions, that producing more ranges beyond 2019 "didn't feel right", and she has a "new vision". The Zoella Beauty and Zoella Lifestyle products were discontinued in 2020. In October 2019, it was reported that the two businesses had a yearly revenue of £3.8 million.

In June 2014, Sugg was a guest panellist on the daytime chat show Loose Women. She also appeared on This Morning in July 2014 to talk about social anxiety. In 2014, Sugg signed a two-book deal with Penguin Books. The North American publishing rights were purchased by Atria. Sugg's debut novel, Girl Online, was released on 25 November 2014. The book is aimed at a young adult audience and surrounds a 15-year-old anonymous blogger and what happens when her blog goes viral. While based around her similar experiences, Sugg has stated that the book is "in no way autobiographical". The novel achieved the highest first-week sales for a debut author since Nielsen BookScan began compiling such records in 1998, with 78,109 copies. , it was the fastest selling book of the year. Penguin stated that "Sugg did not write Girl Online on her own", stating that she had "worked with an expert editorial team to help her bring to life her characters and experiences in a heartwarming and compelling story". It was reported that young-adult novelist Siobhan Curham was a ghostwriter for the novel, although neither Penguin nor Sugg confirmed this; Penguin stated that Curham was an editorial consultant for the novel.

Sugg, along with The Slow Mo Guys and Vice News, featured in television, print, and billboard advertisements by YouTube in the UK which ran from 25 September 2014. The prime time TV adverts were broadcast on the three terrestrial UK channels. Sugg then featured on the 2014 single "Do They Know It's Christmas?" as part of the Band Aid 30 charity supergroup, raising money for the Ebola virus epidemic in West Africa. The single debuted at No.1 on the UK Official Singles Chart. Sugg also took part in the 2015 Comic Relief edition of The Great British Bake Off. A sequel to Girl Online, titled Girl Online: On Tour, was released on 20 October 2015. A third book, Girl Online: Going Solo, was published on 17 November 2016. Sugg's books, alongside those by other YouTubers, were criticised in 2017 for 'not being challenging enough' in a number of UK newspapers. In September 2015, Madame Tussauds announced that they had placed wax figures of Sugg and Deyes on display in their London-based museum.

In late 2016, Sugg and brother Joe released a range of branded merchandise called 'Sugg Life', created in collaboration with The Creator Store, a company owned by Alfie Deyes and Dominic Smales of Gleam Futures. The term 'Sugg Life' is a play on 'Thug life', a phrase popularised by Tupac Shakur's 1990s hip hop group of the same name and more recently an internet meme. The online shop offered a range of products such as hoodies, stickers and phone cases. In August 2017, The Creator Store opened a pop-up shop in Covent Garden which, for ten days, sold limited edition 'Sugg Life X PB' merchandise; a collaboration of Sugg Life and Deyes' 'Pointless Blog' brands. As of May 2018, the Sugg Life online shop is no longer active. Sugg and Deyes are directors of A to Z Creatives and A to Z Merchandise, a Brighton-based brand agency, which they founded in 2018. They are also directors of Crew Live Limited (the company responsible for YouTube convention Hello World) alongside fellow YouTubers Tanya Burr, Marcus Butler, Jim Chapman, Caspar Lee, Louise Pentland, Niomi Smart, Joe Sugg, and Gleam Futures CEO Dominic Smales.

Sugg's non-fiction book, Cordially Invited, offering advice on entertaining guests at home and planning celebrations, was published by Hodder & Stoughton in October 2018. In December 2018, Sugg appeared on Happy Place, a podcast presented by Fearne Cotton, and discussed her career, anxiety and her thoughts on social media.

2019–present: Business interests and The Magpie Society
In February 2019, it was announced that Sugg had worked on a limited edition makeup range with ColourPop Cosmetics, based on 70s fashion. In April 2019, Sugg announced Filmm, a mobile photography app that she co-developed with Elsie Larson and Emma Chapman. Later that year, she announced Template, another mobile editing app designed for editing Instagram stories. In August 2020, Sugg collaborated on a homeware range with Etsy, featuring products co-curated by herself and independent Etsy sellers.

Also in August 2020, she partnered with mental health awareness organisation #IAmWhole and cosmetics retailer Lush on a "digital detox" campaign. With a "Digital Detox Day" on 5 September 2020, the campaign was created to "raise the issue of negative effects that social media can have on mental health" and "encourage users to build a healthier relationship with these platforms and their devices". As part of the partnership, Sugg created a bath bomb with Lush, which will aid global grassroot groups to secure grants that will focus on mental health.  In October, she and Deyes were announced as "ambassadors" promoting A Good Company, a maker of household products.

On 29 October 2020, The Magpie Society: One for Sorrow, a young adult fiction novel she co-authored with Amy McCulloch, was released. The book details events at an elite boarding school from the points of view of two girls – Ivy, written by Sugg, and Audrey, written by McCulloch. It was stated by Sugg that the book would act as the first of a series, with a sequel titled The Magpie Society: Two for Joy which was released in 2021.

Personal life
Sugg has been in a relationship with vlogger Alfie Deyes since October 2012. They made their relationship public in a blog post by Sugg in August 2013. They have a daughter named Ottilie (born August 2021) and reside in Brighton.

Sugg attracted criticism from the media in November 2017 after releasing a 12-door £50 advent calendar, with the "extortionate price" and alleged poor quality receiving attention. The calendar contained items such as a small pack of confetti, a packet of seven stickers, and cookie cutters. A spokesperson for Sugg said, "Zoe is incredibly proud of the Christmas collection and excited to see it in store. However, the pricing and in-store promotional strategy of the collection, including the calendar, is at the control of third parties and is not set by Zoe."

Also in November 2017, Sugg apologised following controversy surrounding posts she had made on social media between 2009 and 2012 mocking gay people and "fat chavs". She responded on Twitter, claiming the posts had been "taken out of context" and writing, "I'm sorry if I have offended anyone, that was not my intention."

Bibliography
 Girl Online (2014)
 Girl Online: On Tour (2015)
 Girl Online: Going Solo (2016)
 Cordially Invited (2018)
 The Magpie Society: One for Sorrow (2020)
 The Magpie Society: Two for Joy (2021)

Awards and nominations
Sugg won the 2011 Cosmopolitan Blog Award in the "Best Established Beauty Blog" category and went on to win the "Best Beauty Vlogger" award the following year. She was also awarded the 2013 and 2014 "Best British Vlogger" award at the Radio 1 Teen Awards; the 2014 Nickelodeon Kids' Choice Award for "UK Favourite Vlogger"; and the 2014 Teen Choice Award for "Choice Web Star: Fashion/Beauty".

Sugg was listed as one of The Telegraph's "40 best beauty bloggers" in September 2014, and "Queen of the Haul" by British Vogue in November. Hers was the fourth most popular channel in the UK in 2014. She was included in the 2015 Debrett's 500, listing the most influential people in Britain, under the New Media category. In 2015 she was named as the "Most Inspirational Women of the Decade" in technology by Grazia and she was named the 34th Sexiest Woman in the world by FHM.

Sugg won the "Choice Web Star" award in the 'Fashion/Beauty' category at the 2015 Teen Choice Awards. In 2019, Sugg, alongside her brother, was nominated for Social Media Superstar at the 2019 Global Awards.

References

Notes

External links

 
 

1990 births
20th-century English people
20th-century English women
21st-century English businesspeople
21st-century English businesswomen
21st-century English novelists
21st-century English women writers
Beauty and makeup YouTubers
British Internet celebrities
British women bloggers
British women children's writers
English bloggers
English video bloggers
English women in business
English women non-fiction writers
English women novelists
English YouTubers
Fashion YouTubers
Lifestyle YouTubers
Living people
People from Brighton
People from Wiltshire